Rohit Mehra may refer to:

 Rohit Mehra (Krrish), a character in the Krrish franchise
 Rohit Mehra (cricketer) (born 1978), Indian cricketer